The Western Producer is a regional weekly publication based in Saskatoon, Saskatchewan, Canada publishing news of interest to western Canadian farmers. It is the largest weekly publication of its type in Canada.

Harris Turner and A.P. "Pat" Waldron began the Saskatoon-based Modern Press publishing company in 1923. This followed the demise of Turner's previous venture, Turner's Weekly which originated in 1918. Modern released its first issue of The Progressive on 24 August 1923. The following year, the publication was renamed The Western Producer.

A major goal of the magazine in its early years was to promote pooling among wheat farmers. The Saskatchewan Wheat Pool was founded in 1924, an organisation that would purchase Modern Publishing in the early 1930s and support The Western Producer through the Great Depression. Until moving to its current location in the late 1990s, the Western Producer operated out of the Modern Press Building.

GVIC Communications bought the publishing company from the Saskatchewan Wheat Pool in 2002. The current owner of Western Producer Publications is Glacier Media. The current publisher is Shaun Jessome. The editor is Michael Raine.

References

External links
 Official website

Agricultural magazines
Business magazines published in Canada
Weekly magazines published in Canada
Magazines established in 1923
Magazines published in Saskatchewan
Mass media in Saskatoon